The Beutler test, also known as the fluorescent spot test, is a screening test used to identify enzyme defects.

Uses
It can be used in screening for:
 galactosemia
 glucose-6-phosphate dehydrogenase deficiency

References

Further reading
 

Blood tests